Andreyevka is a rural locality (a selo) in Tukayevsky Selsoviet, Aurgazinsky District, Bashkortostan, Russia. The population was 235 as of 2010. There are 2 streets.

Geography 
Andreyevka is located 36 km northwest of Tolbazy (the district's administrative centre) by road. Makarovo is the nearest rural locality.

References 

Rural localities in Aurgazinsky District
Ufa Governorate